Kyle Shepherd (born 8 July 1987 in Cape Town) is a South African Jazz musician (Piano, Saxophone, Xaru, singing, composition) and poet. Musically, Shepherd is based on the roots of Township-Jazz and Goema-Beat.

Life and work 
Shepherd, whose mother worked as a violinist at Abdullah Ibrahim school M7, received classical violin lessons from the age of five. As a teenager he discovered improvisation and learned to play the piano as a self-taught. Since 2009 he has recorded several albums with his trio or quartet. On the album Into Darkness he acted as a solo pianist. He wrote the soundtrack for the feature film ``Noem my Skollie: Call Me Thief (2016).

Shepherd has worked with musicians such as Zim Ngqawana, Louis Moholo, Robbie Jansen, Errol Dyers, Hilton Schilder, Mark Fransman and Ayanda Sikade . His tours led to southern Africa as well as to Europe, Japan and China. Shepherd appeared as a guest musician on the albums of Carlo Mombelli, Kesivan Naidoo, Andreas Tschopp and in the band  Skyjack   with. As curator of the SWR New Jazz Meeting 2016 he gave several concerts with his group and the soloists Lionel Loueke and Mthunzi Mvubu.

 Prizes and awards 
Shepherd's album fineArt was nominated in 2010 for the  South African Music Awards  (SAMA) in the category "Best Traditional Jazz", his album "A Portrait of Home" in the following year. In 2014 he won the  Standard Bank Young Artist Award  for the genre Jazz.

 Discography 
 Albums 
 fineArt (Sheer Sound 2009, with Buddy Wells, Dylan Tabisher, Claude Cozens)
 A Portrait of Home (Sheer Sound 2010, with Shane Cooper, Jonno Sweetman)
 South African History! X (Sheer Sound 2012)
 Dream State (Sheer Sound 2014, with Shane Cooper, Jonno Sweetman and Buddy Wells)
 Kyle Shepherd, Lionel Loueke,  Sound Portraits from Contemporary Africa '' (Jazzhaus 2017, with Mthunzi Mvubu, Shane Cooper, Jonno Sweetman)

Film

References

External links 
   – official site
 
 

1987 births
Living people
Musicians from Cape Town
Cape Coloureds
South African jazz pianists
South African film score composers